Aurora Alternative High School was a high school in Bloomington, Indiana (United States).

The Bloomington Graduation School replaced the Aurora Alternative School shortly after it closed.  The overlap in services and population essentially amounted to the closing of Aurora and opening of the Graduation School as a rebranding of Aurora, yet with large changes and relocation to a different building.

Aurora Alternative High School was for kids who were not successful in traditional schools or just wanted a fresh start in school life. It was also a school of choice, so a student did not have to go there, and students could choose to drop out of the school if it didn't suit their needs. It only accepted students at the end of every trimester (in November, February and May).

On September 7, 2009, the enrollment to the start of the 2009–2010 school year was 80.

Educational institutions established in 1995
Vocational & technical high schools in Indiana
Defunct schools in Indiana
Schools in Monroe County, Indiana
1995 establishments in Indiana
2010 disestablishments in Indiana
Educational institutions disestablished in 2010